Koruthaialos sindu, the bright red velvet bob, is a butterfly belonging to the family Hesperiidae. The species was first described by father and son entomologists Cajetan and Rudolf Felder in 1860.

References 

Butterflies of Singapore
Butterflies of Asia
Butterflies of Malaysia
Butterflies described in 1860
Butterflies of Indochina
Taxa named by Baron Cajetan von Felder
Taxa named by Rudolf Felder